Real Detective is a Canadian production, police docudrama (2016-2017) broadcast by Netflix. The anthology series tells a different US true crime murder each episode, through the detective(s) that worked the particular case in a documentary style, alongside a drama re-enactment of the events.

Production 
Each episode follows a US case in a documentary style, the drama aspect is filmed in Laval, Québec, Canada.

The show had the highest production budget for a true crime show; just under $4m.

Episodes

Season 1 (2016)

Season 2 (2017)

Awards and nominations 
Real Detective has been nominated for five awards and won one.

| Details
|-
| 2017
| ACTRA Montreal Awards
| Outstanding Performance - Female
| Sabrina Campilii
| 
|
| -
|-
| 2017
| Canadian Screen Award
| Best Writing in a Factual Program or Series
| Tim Doiron
| 
| 
| Episode: 'Malice'
|-
| 2017
| Canadian Screen Award
| Best Photography in a Documentary Program or Series
| Barry Russell (Director of Photography)
| 
| 
| Episode: 'Darkness'
|-
| 2017
| Joey Award
| Best Principal or Guest Starring Actor in a TV Series 7-10 Years
| Jaeda LeBlanc
| 
| 
| -
|-
| 2018
| Canadian Screen Award
| Best Sound, Non-Fiction
| Jeremy Reid (Re-recording Mixer)

Sébastien Bédard (Sound Designer)
| 
| 
| -
|-
| 2018
| Canadian Screen Award
| Best Picture Editing, Factual
| Fannie Daoust

Glenn Berman
| 
| 
| Episode: 'Blood Brothers'

References

External links 

 

True crime television series
Netflix original documentary television series
2016 Canadian television series debuts
2017 Canadian television series endings
English-language Netflix original programming